Pope Francis issued the document Magnum principium ("The Great Principle") dated 3 September 2017 on his own authority. It modified the 1983 Code of Canon Law to shift responsibility and authority for translations of liturgical texts into modern languages to national and regional conferences of bishops and restrict the role of the Congregation for Divine Worship and the Discipline of the Sacraments (CDW). It was made public on 9 September 2017 and its effective date was 1 October of the same year.

While directly concerned only with liturgical texts, it represented a significant initiative in the program long advocated by Francis of changing the role of the Roman Curia in the Catholic Church and fostering "shared decision-making between local churches and Rome." That he used canon law to achieve his aims demonstrated, in the view of liturgist Rita Ferrone, the intensity of his commitment to this project.

Background
For several decades the Catholic Church has increased the use of the vernacular in place of Latin in its liturgies. The Sacred Congregation of Rites, predecessor of the CDW, granted permission for the use of local languages in several countries with expanding missionary activity, including Mandarin Chinese in Mass except for the Canon in 1949 and Hindi in India in 1950. For rituals other than Mass, it gave permission for the use of a French translation in 1948 and a German one in 1951.

The Second Vatican Council's Sacrosanctum Concilium, issued by Pope Paul VI on 4 December 1963, discussed the use of the vernacular in the context of the need to enhance lay participation in liturgies. It suggested an increased use of the "mother tongue" of the congregation and instructed local groups of bishops to consider the role of the vernacular. It "opened up the possibility of linguistic change but did not make it mandatory".

As local groups of bishops and Vatican authorities disputed the quality and nature of translations, the CDW's instruction Liturgiam Authenticam, issued on 28 March 2001 with the approval of Pope John Paul II, ruled that texts "insofar as possible, must be translated integrally and in the most exact manner, without omissions or additions in terms of their content, and without paraphrases or glosses. Any adaptation to the characteristics or the nature of the various vernacular languages is to be sober and discreet." One side in the ongoing debate promoted the philosophy of translation called dynamic equivalence, roughly "sense-for-sense" translation, rather than the more literal word-for-word translation that John Paul said was required.

In the 21st century, Catholic bishops in Germany decided not to work with a commission Pope Benedict XVI erected to guide their translation efforts and then found their own translations rejected by the CDW. French, Italian and Spanish translations were rejected as well.  The CDW also dictated much of the work and staffing of the multi-national board, the International Commission on English in the Liturgy (ICEL), created to produce English translations, which have met with criticism. The bishops of Japan contested the Vatican's right to judge the quality of a translation into Japanese, questioning both the quality of the review and the subsidiary position in which the CDW's review placed them.

Text
In Magnum principium, Francis outlined the mission of the translation effort of liturgical texts:

While acknowledging the role Latin continues to play in Catholic liturgy, he expressed confidence that translations could achieve a similar status, that over time "vernacular languages themselves [...] would be able to become liturgical languages, standing out in a not dissimilar way to liturgical Latin for their elegance of style and the profundity of their concepts".

Where the Council fathers spoke of the participation of the laity, Francis wrote of "their right to a conscious and active participation in liturgical celebration".

He recognized the role of the CDW and said that to promote "vigilant and creative collaboration full of reciprocal trust" between the CDW and conferences of bishops he thought "some principles handed on since the time of the [Second Vatican] Council should be more clearly reaffirmed and put into practice".

Magnum principium modified two clauses in canon 838 of the Code of Canon Law. Before its modifications the passage at issue read:

The revised text read (highlighting in original):

Accompanying Note 
A note accompanying the release of Magnum principium authored by Archbishop Roche, secretary of the CDW, explained that the CDW was tasked with confirming a translation, that the process "leaves responsibility for the translation, presumed to be faithful, to [...] the bishops' conference", and "presupposes a positive evaluation of the faithfulness and congruence of the produced texts with respect to the Latin text". The CDW's role is to ratify the bishop's approval, not to review the translation itself. The CDW still has a role in reviewing "adaptations", that is, additions to liturgical texts, rather than translations per se. The term adaptations, as used by liturgists, refers to modifications introduced into a liturgy to incorporate or reflect local culture, which can include practices, movement, costume, and music as well as text. The more common term for this undertaking is inculturation. The note also stated that "The object of the changes is to define better the roles of the Apostolic See and the Conferences of Bishops in respect to their proper competencies which are different yet remain complementary."

Reactions
In The Tablet, Christopher Lamb wrote that "This throws open the possibility that the 2011 English Roman Missal–which became mired in disagreement with claims that the Vatican had overly controlled the process–could be changed. The onus will now be on local bishops to take the initiative." In America, liturgist John F. Baldovin wrote: "those conferences which have been experiencing tension with the Vatican over revised translations, like the French-speaking and German-speaking, now have much more breathing room in deciding what is best for translating liturgical texts".

Cardinal Blaise Cupich thought Francis was "reconnecting the church with the Second Vatican Council" by "giving in this document an authoritative interpretation of the council as it relates to the responsibilities of bishops for the liturgical life of the church".

Cardinal Reinhard Marx of Munich-Freising said that German bishops felt "great relief" and the Episcopal Conference of Germany thanked Francis for underlining the "genuine doctrinal authority” of episcopal conferences.

Postquam Summus Pontifex 
On 22 October 2021, the Congregation for Divine Worship released the decree Postquam Summus Pontifex. The decree is an interpretation as well as corrections of previous documents, to correct "whatever is found to the contrary [of Magnum principium] in the Institutiones generales and in the Prænotanda of the liturgical books, as well as in the Instructions, Declarations, and Notifications published by this Dicastery according to the old norms of §§ 2 and 3 of can. 838". For example, those changes apply to Liturgiam authenticam.

Notes

See also
 Dei verbum
 Divino afflante Spiritu
 Liturgiam authenticam
 Liturgical movement
 Liturgical reforms of Pope Pius XII
 Verbum Domini

References

Further reading 

 Rita Ferrone, "Pope Francis's Motu Proprio on Translation", 9 September 2017, Pray Tell

External links
 Text of the Apostolic Letter Motu Proprio Magnum Principium, 3 September 2017 

Catholic liturgy
Catholic liturgical law
Translation
Motu proprio of Pope Francis
2017 in Christianity
2017 documents